The 1990 Carlentini earthquake (Italian: Terremoto di Carlentini del 1990) occurred off the Sicilian coast, 20 km east northeast from the town of Augusta, Sicily on 13 December at 01:24 local time. The moderately-sized earthquake measuring 5.6 on the moment magnitude scale resulted in the deaths of 19 people and caused at least 200 injuries. It also inflicted significant damage in the region, leaving 2,500 homeless.

Lasting 45 seconds, the shock was assigned a maximum Modified Mercalli intensity of VII–VIII (Very strong–Severe). The earthquake was followed-up by four aftershocks that were felt by people.

Tectonic setting

The island of Sicily is situated near the edge of a convergent plate boundary where the African Plate is colliding with Eurasia. The denser African Plate subducts or dives beneath the Eurasian Plate. Subduction occurs offshore in the Mediterranean Sea along the Calabrian subduction zone. The presence of active subduction makes Sicily a seismically active island due to the resulting crustal deformation associated with the interaction of the Eurasian and African plates.

Earthquake
The largest shock measured 5.6 on the moment magnitude scale and 5.4 on the Richter scale. Focal mechanism of the mainshock suggested it occurred as a result of strike-slip faulting on either a sinistral, north-south striking, vertically dipping fault, or a dextral, east-west fault plane.

Foreshocks and aftershocks
There were four small foreshocks that were recorded in early December up to one day before the mainshock. Two small earthquakes occurred on the same day of December 3. On December 11 and 12, two foreshocks with magnitudes of 2.1 to 2.4 occurred.

In the first three days after the mainshock, there was a period of unusually low seismicity in the region. Only a handful of aftershocks, the largest being a 2.7, was recorded in the first 30 minutes after the earthquake. The largest aftershock measured  4.6 or  4.5 on December 16 at 13:50 UTC. Focal mechanism of the largest aftershock suggested normal faulting. The occurrence of the largest aftershock led to a sudden increase of seismic activity in the region, which continued for 19 days. The aftershock sequence would continue until January 5 of 1991.

Damage

The quake interrupted railway services on the Catania-Caltagirone-Gela railway, and the Messina–Syracuse railway lines due to damaged communication. Train stations in the towns of Brucoli and Scordia were seriously damaged. Public buildings including a hospital in Mineo and Scordia were affected.

At least 41 municipalities across the provinces of Syracuse, Catania and Ragusa. By January 3, 1991, authorities have announced that 6,103 buildings were damaged, destroyed or unsafe for use. At least 5,133 of the structures damaged were in Syracuse, 929 in Catania and 41 in Ragusa. Over 13,217 residents became homeless, with the most reported in Syracuse.

Casualties
In the town of Carlentini, with a population of 10,000 at the time, was the most affected population center during the quake, with most of the recorded fatalities here. The bodies of five people of the same family were pulled out from the rubble of their collapsed home, killed while in their sleep. Another family of seven was discovered dead in another part of the town. An eighth victim belonging to the family died in a hospital in Lentini due to injuries sustained. Four people in the Catania, all seniors, and another in Niscemi, died from heart attacks attributed to the shock.

At least 200 people suffered injuries as a result of the tremor, while 2,500 people were made homeless. Five people in two neighbourhoods in Carlentini were seriously injured. A five-year-old boy was among the survivors that was pulled out of the rubble of a collapsed home.

Response
Just before the earthquake struck, an emergency exercise simulating an earthquake with 500 casualties within an area of 40 km² had taken place. During the actual rescue and recovery efforts however, life-saving equipment did not perform as expected and were functioning poorly. The poor performance of rescue workers and equipment led to a criminal inquiry.

More than 7,000 homeless residents were relocated to abandoned salt pans where containers were set up as makeshift homes. Further damage was inflicted by the large aftershock on December 26, which prompted the International Red Cross and Red Crescent Movement to set up assistance camps in Scordia, Militello and Palagonia.

See also
List of earthquakes in 1990
List of earthquakes in Italy

References

External links

Carlentini earthquake
Carlentini earthquake
Earthquakes in Italy
Carlentini earthquake
History of Syracuse, Sicily
Disasters in Sicily
Carlentini earthquake